The 2010 Fórmula Truck season was the 15th Fórmula Truck season. It began on March 7 at Guaporé and ended on December 5 at Brasília after ten rounds.

After a closely fought championship, it was the Scania of Roberval Andrade, driving for the RVR Corinthians Motorsport that won his second Fórmula Truck title after a season-long battle with the RM Competições Volkswagen of defending champion Felipe Giaffone. Andrade and Giaffone finished tied on 176 points but with five wins compared to Giaffone's one, Andrade claimed his first title since 2002. Third place went to the best Mercedes-Benz driver, four-time champion Wellington Cirino, who finished 34 points behind the top two taking a single victory at Campo Grande. Other victories were taken by Giaffone's team-mate Valmir Benavides, who triumphed at Caruaru, Geraldo Piquet won the series' only race outside of Brazil in Buenos Aires, while Iveco took a solitary victory with Beto Monteiro winning at Velopark. Volkswagen won the Manufacturers' Championship by 57 points ahead of Scania.

Teams and drivers
All drivers were Brazilian-registered.

Race calendar and results
All races were held in Brazil, excepting round at Autódromo Juan y Oscar Gálvez, that was held in Argentina.

Championship standings
Points were awarded as follows:

Drivers' championship

Notes
The top five after the race ensures a place on the podium.

Manufacturers' championship

Notes
Three best trucks of each make.

References

External links
 Official website of the Fórmula Truck (in Portuguese)

Formula Truck
Fórmula Truck seasons